The New Zealand national cricket team toured the West Indies from 30 June to 6 August. The tour consisted of five One Day International matches and two Test matches. It also featured two Twenty20 International matches that were hosted in Lauderhill, Florida in the United States.

Squads 

†withdrawn

T20I series

1st T20I

2nd T20I

ODI series 
All times local (UTC-5 in Jamaica, UTC-4 in all other locations)

1st ODI

2nd ODI

3rd ODI

4th ODI

5th ODI

Tour match

Three-day: West Indies Board President's XI vs New Zealanders

Test series

1st Test

2nd Test

References

External links 
 West Indies v New Zealand | Cricket news, live scores, fixtures, features and statistics on ESPN Cricinfo

2012 in New Zealand cricket
2012
International cricket competitions in 2012
West
2012 in West Indian cricket